Barnens lexikon was a series of encyclopedias for children of various ages. It was originally published in 1981 following an idea from Sven Lidman.

References

Barnens lexikon (entire book), Bonniers juniorförlag och Lidman Production, 1981, 1985

1981 children's books
Swedish encyclopedias
Children's encyclopedias
20th-century encyclopedias
Book series introduced in 1981